Port-Sainte-Marie is a commune in the Lot-et-Garonne department in south-western France. Port-Sainte-Marie station has rail connections to Agen, Langon and Bordeaux.

See also
Communes of the Lot-et-Garonne department

References

Portsaintemarie